Isothermal compressed air energy storage
Congress of the International Union of Anthropological and Ethnological Sciences